The 2017 Southland Conference women's basketball tournament, a part of the 2016–17 NCAA Division I women's basketball season, took place March 9–12, 2017 at the Merrell Center in Katy, Texas. The winner of the tournament, the Central Arkansas Sugar Bears, received the Southland Conference's automatic bid to the 2017 NCAA tournament.

Seeds and regular season standings
Only the Top 8 teams advanced to the Southland Conference tournament. The co-regular season champion Abilene Christian Wildcats were ineligible for the NCAA Tourney.  Their seed fell to the next eligible team. Abilene Christian and Incarnate Word were ineligible for post-season play as they were in the final year of a 4-year transition from D2 to D1. They will be eligible for the Southland tourney in 2018. This chart shows all the teams records and standings and explains why teams advanced to the conference tourney or finished in certain tiebreaking positions.

Schedule
Source:

Bracket

First round

Quarterfinals

Semifinals

Championship

Awards and honors
Source: 
Tournament MVP: Maggie Proffitt, Central ArkansasAll-Tournament Team:'''

 Maggie Proffitt, Central Arkansas

 Stevi Parker, Stephen F. Austin
 Taylor Baudoin, Central Arkansas
 Taylor Ross, Stephen F. Austin
 Kassie Jones, Texas A&M-Corpus Christi

See also
2017 Southland Conference men's basketball tournament
Southland Conference women's basketball tournament

References

External links
 2017 Southland Conference Men's and Women's Tournament Page

Southland Conference women's basketball tournament
2016–17 Southland Conference women's basketball season
Southland Conference Women's basketball